Elum Ghar, also known as Mount Ilam is a  mountain located between the Swat and Buner districts of Pakistan. Elum Ghar is the highest peak in the region, and is snow-covered most of the year. It is located west of Pir Baba's shrine in the Buner District of the Khyber Pakhtunkhwa of Pakistan. The mountain was a significant pilgrimage site for Hindus until 1947, and is believed to be the site where a previous incarnation of the Buddha gave up his life.

History

Archaeologists have found ruins of the Indus Valley civilization around the mountain, and believe that there may still be more buried ancient ruins. The top of the mountain is locally known as "Jogiano sar".  This site is also significant in Hinduism.

Ilam Ġhar's peak is called Jūgyānū Sar, where Rām taḫt was believed to be located. Hindus used to worship Rām taḫt as they believe Rām Čandar spent part of his banbās "forest-dwelling" there. This tradition is not mentioned in the Rāmāyaṇa of Vālmīki. Hindus used to celebrate Sawan Sangran every year at Rām taḫt. On the first night of Sawan they would hold vigil, worship, and recite their holy book. At dawn the paṇḍit would lead them up the mountain to Rām taḫt, where praśād would be distributed and circumabulation occured. The site had shades for the Hindu pilgrims until they were removed by the Wāli of Swat, Miangul Abdul Wadud. The festival is no longer celebrated.

The mountain has snakes and cobras near the top. There is a local proverb that says, Maar chey zwaan shi nu da elum ghar ta laar shi, which means, When a snake reaches its youth, it goes to Mount Elum.

According to the Indologist Giuseppe Tucci's proposal the rock of Aornos is at the summit of Elum Ghar (Mount Ilam).  Alexander the Great's forces faced a tough battle on this site.  However, there are other possible sites for the rock of Aornos identified, such as Pir Sar in Shangla.

Geography
The city of Mingora can be seen from atop the mountain. The mountain is popular among hikers due to its many streams and lakes that can be seen while going up the mountain.  Going up is tough as there is no local transport.

Festivals
Every year at the end of July or at the beginning of August, the festival of Jushn-e-Elum is held. It is celebrated by the youth from nearby villages, The celebration is an opportunity to get out of the heat of the valley and stay for a couple of days on the cooler mountain.

References

External links
 TCKP Tourism - Elum Mountain

Videos 
 History of Elum Mountain, Swat Pakistan, By NAWAB KHAN
 The Beauty of Buner Elum Mountain -The Travellers - YouTube
 Elum village and elum mountain - YouTube

Buner District
Mountains of Khyber Pakhtunkhwa
Two-thousanders of Pakistan